The Morane-Saulnier MS.350 was a French aerobatic trainer flown in 1936. Only one was built but it had a long career, flying post-war until the 1960s.

Design

The MS.350 was a two bay biplane with equal span wings. In plan these were straight tapered, with sweep only on the leading edge, and with elliptical tips. Only the lower wing had dihedral. Both upper and lower  wings were built around two duralumin box-spars, joined together on each side by a single, faired, broad-footed interplane strut to a steel cross-link between the spars. There were ailerons on both upper and lower wings. A pair of outward leaning, N-form cabane struts braced the upper wing centre section high over the fuselage.  The usual wire bracing completed the wing structure.

The trainer was powered by a neatly cowled,  Renault 6Pei 6-cylinder inverted air-cooled inline engine. The fuselage was constructed around four duralumin tube longerons with metal skinning from engine to cockpit and fabric covered behind. Its open cockpit was just behind the trailing edge of the upper wing, where there was a semicircular cutout to improve the pilot's upward field of view. Behind his seat there was a  storage locker.

The horizontal tail was essentially trapezoidal in plan and included balanced elevators which had a nick for operation of a balanced rudder.  The fin was trapezoidal in profile and the rudder straight-edged, though with a rounded top. It extended to the keel.  The tail surfaces were fabric covered metal structures.

Each mainwheel was mounted on a steel tube leg hinged on the lower fuselage longeron. Together with an oleo strut, each leg was enclosed in a fairing; the wheels also had fairings and were fitted with brakes. The tailskid was steerable.

Development
The MS.350 made its first flight on 8 February 1936, piloted by Michel Détroyat, who was a well known aerobatic pilot. He demonstrated it in public on 17 May at a meeting in Saint-Germain, Paris. Its development was protracted, lasting until October 1937.  At some early stage the original engine was replaced by a Renault 6Q, a rather similar 6-cylinder inverted air-cooled inline engine producing .

Operational history
Détroyat's outstanding aerobatic displays across pre-war Europe made the MS.350 well known.  It survived the war and was registered as F-BDYL in 1954 in the name of Jean Cliquet, Morane-Saulnier's chief test pilot, and based at Ossun. From 1956 it was owned by Morane-Saulnier and flew from their base at Villacoubly until it was wrecked in Italy on 8 December 1964.

Specifications

References

Bibliography

Further reading

1930s French military trainer aircraft
MS.350
Biplanes
Aircraft first flown in 1936